Presto is a Bolivian town located in Jaime Zudáñez Province, Chuquisaca Department, 95 km east of Sucre.

Populated places in Chuquisaca Department